Pixie Love Davies (born 9 December 2006) is an English actress. Born and raised in England, she began her career in 2012, starring in the BBC's The Secret of Crickley Hall. After making her film debut in Nativity 2: Danger in the Manger (2012), she appeared in several other features, including Out of the Dark (2014) and Miss Peregrine's Home for Peculiar Children (2016). In 2018, she had her breakout role as Annabel Banks in Disney's Mary Poppins Returns. Davies is also set to voice Adel in Netflix's The Magician's Elephant.

Life and career
Pixie Love Davies was born and raised in England. Davies played her first role in 2012 as Cally Caleigh, the youngest daughter, in the BBC's television drama The Secret of Crickley Hall. Her performance was well-received by critics; for example, GamesRadar+ called her great, favourably stating that while she was humorous, she "never seem[ed] precocious". In the same year, Davies made her film debut in comedy film Nativity 2: Danger in the Manger. She then performed in guest roles before playing Hannah Harriman in Out of the Dark at age seven. While the film was generally negatively received, Davies' performance garnered praise. RogerEbert.com said, "Davies is cute enough, she understandably doesn't have much range beyond pouting, and smiling."

In 2016, she played the role of Bronwyn Bruntley, a girl who possesses superhuman strength, in Tim Burton's film adaptation of Miss Peregrine's Home for Peculiar Children. The film was released on 30 September 2016, and received generally favourable reviews from critics. Writing for Common Sense Media, S. Jhoanna Robledo called the cast "pretty strong". In 2018, Davies played her breakout role as Annabel Banks in Mary Poppins sequel, Mary Poppins Returns. The film grossed $349.5 million at the box office and was complimented by critics. The child performances garnered critical acclaim. Rachit Gupta of The Times of India called them "perfectly cute" and The Hollywood Reporter David Rooney wrote that they were exemplary. For their work, she and the cast of Mary Poppins Returns received an Ensemble Cast Award at the 2019 Palm Springs International Film Festival. In 2020, Davies was announced to have joined the cast of Netflix animated film The Magician's Elephant. She will voice Adel, the long-lost sister of protagonist Peter.

Filmography

References

External links
 
 

Living people
2006 births
21st-century English actresses
English child actresses
English film actresses
English television actresses
English voice actresses